Pityocona probleta is a moth in the family Gelechiidae. It was described by Edward Meyrick in 1927. It is found on Guadalcanal.

The wingspan is 10–11 mm. The forewings are light buff overlaid with a mixture of drab and drab grey, sparsely sprinkled with blackish, blackish specks beneath the fold at one-fifth and beneath the costa at one-third. The stigmata are black, sometimes weakly ringed with greyish, the plical usually elongate, obliquely before the first discal and the second discal sometimes elongate, conspicuous. The hindwings are smoke grey.

References

Pityocona
Moths described in 1961